The 13th Infantry Brigade was a regular infantry brigade of the British Army that saw active service during both the First and the Second World Wars.

First World War
The 13th Brigade was temporarily under the command of 28th Division between 23 February and 7 April 1915, when it was replaced by 84th Brigade from that Division and moved to the regular 5th Division. It served on the Western Front for most of the war except for a brief period in Italy.

Order or battle
Component units included:
 2nd Battalion, King's Own Scottish Borderers
 2nd Battalion, Duke of Wellington's (West Riding Regiment) (left January 1916)
 1st Battalion, Queen's Own (Royal West Kent Regiment)
 2nd Battalion, King's Own (Yorkshire Light Infantry) (left December 1915)
 1/9th (City of London) Battalion, London Regiment (joined November 1914, left February 1915)
 14th (Service) Battalion, Royal Warwickshire Regiment (joined December 1915, became Divisional Pioneers October 1918)
 15th (Service) Battalion, Royal Warwickshire Regiment (joined January 1916, disbanded October 1918)
 16th (Service) Battalion, Royal Warwickshire Regiment (joined October 1918)

Second World War
The brigade was sent to France in mid-September 1939, initially as an independent formation, where it became part of the British Expeditionary Force.

After the retreat from France the brigade reformed in the United Kingdom. In April–May 1942 13th Brigade, after leaving the United Kingdom along with the rest of the division, was involved in the landings on Vichy held French Madagascar in 1942.

The brigade, with the rest of 5th Infantry Division, fought in the Allied invasion of Sicily and the Italian Campaign where Sergeant Maurice Albert Windham Rogers of the 2nd Battalion, Wiltshire Regiment was posthumously awarded the Victoria Cross in 1944, the first and only VC to be awarded to the brigade and division during the Second World War.

In 1945 the 5th Infantry Division was transferred to the British Second Army participate in the final stages of the North West Europe Campaign where they invaded Germany.

The brigade was part of the 5th Division throughout the Second World War.

Order of battle
The 13th Brigade was constituted as follows during the war:
 2nd Battalion, Cameronians (Scottish Rifles)
 2nd Battalion, Royal Inniskilling Fusiliers (until 28 September 1939, rejoined 30 November 1939, left 14 July 1944)
 2nd Battalion, Wiltshire Regiment
 13th Infantry Brigade Anti-Tank Company (disbanded 6 January 1941)
 13th Infantry Brigade Special Company (from 4 May 1943 until 20 June 1944)
 5th Battalion, Essex Regiment (from 14 July 1944)

Between 23 April and 19 May 1942 the following units were under command of the brigade for operations in Madagascar:

 91st Field Regiment, Royal Artillery
 252nd Field Company, Royal Engineers
 13th Infantry Brigade Company, Royal Army Service Corps
 164th Field Ambulance, Royal Army Medical Corps

Commanders
The following officers commanded the 13th Brigade during its existence:
 Major-General William F. Vetch: June 1902-June 1906
 Major-General Henry M. Lawson: June 1906-May 1907
 Brigadier-General Charles C. Monro: May 1907-January 1911
 Brigadier-General Thompson Capper: February 1911-February 1914
 Brigadier-General Gerald J. Cuthbert: February–October 1914
 Brigadier-General William B. Hickie: 1 October 1914
 Colonel A. Martyn: 13 October 1914 (acting)
 Lieutenant-Colonel W. M. Withycombe: 7 November 1914 (acting)
 Brigadier-General Edward J. Cooper: 3 December 1914-February 1915
 Lieutenant-Colonel L. J. Bols: 1 February 1915 (acting)
 Brigadier-General Robert Wanless O'Gowan: 8 February–August 1915
 Brigadier-General Charles C. M. Maynard: 21 August–31 August 1915
 Colonel P. M. Robinson: 31 August 1915 (acting)
 Brigadier-General Charles C. M. Maynard: 18 September 1915
 Lieutenant-Colonel E. S. D'E. Coke: 23 October 1915 (acting)
 Brigadier-General Lumley O. W. Jones: 2 November 1915-16 November 1917
 Lieutenant-Colonel L. Murray: 16 November 1917 (acting)
 Brigadier-General Lumley O. W. Jones: 18 December 1917
 Lieutenant-Colonel C. T. Furber: 8 September 1918 (acting)
 Lieutenant-Colonel J. W. C. Kirk: 15 September 1918 (acting)
 Brigadier-General Arthur T. Beckwith: 21 September 1918 – 1919
 Brigadier-General T.Stanton Lambert: October 1919-June 1921
 Brigadier William A. Blake: December 1926-December 1930
 Brigadier David Forster: December 1930-December 1934
 Brigadier John H.T. Priestman: December 1934-September 1938
 Brigadier A. Reade Godwin-Austen: September 1938-January 1939
 Brigadier Henry B.D. Willcox: January–November 1939
 Brigadier Miles C. Dempsey: November 1939-July 1940
 Brigadier Douglas N. Wimberley: July–September 1940
 Brigadier Valentine C. Russell: September 1940-May 1943
 Brigadier Lorne M. Campbell: May 1943-September 1944
 Brigadier Francis R.G. Matthews: September–November 1944
 Brigadier William H. Lambert: November 1944-August 1945
 Brigadier Robert W.M. de Winton: August 1945-February 1947

Sources

References

13
Infantry brigades of the British Army in World War I
Infantry brigades of the British Army in World War II